Generality may be:
The assumption of Generality, a concept in psychology

A generality or generalty is a word used during the Ancien Régime in France and other Western European countries to indicate a specific territory under direct rule of central government (as opposed to a "particularity", which was the government of established provinces or principalities).  These include:
Généralité (France)
Generaliteitslanden or Generality Lands (Netherlands)
Generalitat (Spain)
 Generalitat de Catalunya, or Government of Catalonia
 Generalitat Valenciana, or Governmental of Valencia